The  (sometimes abbreviated as F–F, and occasionally also described as ) was a joint-stock company based in Bulle, Switzerland.

History 
The company was founded on 7 August 1911, and from 4 January 1912 was the operator of the Fribourg–Farvagny trolleybus system, an early interurban trolleybus line in the canton of Fribourg, Switzerland.  Its share capital amounted to 450,000 Swiss francs, half provided by the canton of Fribourg and the other half by the communities adjacent to Bulle.

As a result of World War I, the company ran into financial difficulties, and on 1 April 1929 therefore ceded the management of the trolleybus line to the Chemins de fer électriques de la Gruyère (CEG). The CEG eventually bought the company on 30 June 1930 for 85,000 Swiss francs and continued to operate the trolleybus system up until its closure in 1932.

See also 

List of trolleybus systems in Switzerland
Trolleybuses in Fribourg

References

Notes

Books

External links 
 Image gallery at www.polier.ch – images of the Fribourg–Farvagny trolleybus system.

This article is based upon a translation of the German language version as at December 2011.

Fribourg-Farvagny
Fribourg-Farvagny
Transport in Fribourg